Gimme Some Lovin': Jukebox Vol II is the twelfth studio album by Australian pop vocal group Human Nature, released on 22 July 2016. The album was announced on 29 April 2016.
The album debuted at number one on the ARIA charts, becoming the band's fourth in Australia and first since Dancing in the Street: The Songs of Motown II in October 2006.

The album was re-released on 4 November 2016 as the Australian Tour Edition. This came with a bonus DVD of 29 greatest hits video clips, spanning the group's entire career.

Background and release
In 2014, Human Nature released Jukebox; an album of 1950s and 60s pop standards. The album peaked at number 2 on the ARIA Charts and was certified platinum. Gimme Some Lovin''' is the follow up to Jukebox.

Promotional videos were released for "Gimme Some Lovin'", "Be My Baby" and "Forgive Me Now" throughout July 2016.

Review
Jessica Mule from Renowned for Sound'' gave the album 3 stars out of 5 saying; "Human Nature had a mission. And that mission was to recreate and cover the perfect old school jukebox playlist for the second time round" but at time pondered if she'd heard them do these songs before. Mule complemented on the sole original track on the album, "Forgive Me Now" saying it's "An echoed plea of apology, with quite a beautiful tone and build up, starting with an acoustic plucked guitar and vocal, before adding in the background harmonies, drums, and strings. It just goes to remind us that Human Nature can perform more than just covers.

Track listing

Charts

Weekly charts

Year-end charts

Certifications

Release history

See also
 List of number-one albums of 2016 (Australia)
 List of top 25 albums for 2016 in Australia

References

2016 albums
Covers albums
Sony Music Australia albums
Human Nature (band) albums
Sequel albums